
Lieutenant colonel general is a general rank in a number of armed forces in the countries of the Balkans.

The rank of lieutenant colonel general represents a rationalisation of the situation in some armies of a lieutenant general outranking a major general, when a major outranks a lieutenant.

Lieutenant colonel general's insignia

Army

Air force

See also 
 Lieutenant (Eastern Europe)
 Lieutenant colonel (Eastern Europe)
 Colonel (Eastern Europe)
 Colonel general

References

Military ranks of Serbia
Military ranks of North Macedonia
Military ranks of Yugoslavia